Kjell Samkopf (born 6 April 1952, in Bærum, Norway) is a Norwegian musician (drums) and composer, married 1993 to the dancer Mona Walderhaug (born 21 December 1956).

Biography 
Samkopf is a central figure on the Norwegian contemporary music scene, with a varied career as a composer, musician and educator and had an extensive background from various music genres. He was for many years associated with the Norwegian Academy of Music, where he attended the diploma program in composition in 1973 without any formal musical education. Here he worked as a musical teacher from 1979 and later as professor and head of the percussion department.

From the mid 1970s he was an active performer as drummer and he stepped in as timpanist in Trondheim Symphony Orchestra (1974–75). He was for many years associated with Oslo Filharmoniske Orkester and worked as regular drummer in the Orchestra of Den Norske Opera for some years. He worked within "Ny Musikks Ensemble" and later in contemporary music ensemble "Octoband".

Samkopf's compositional output comprises nine full-length dance performances. He was also selected as the 1985 composer in residence for the Arctic Arts Festival. Smakopf's list of works features chamber music, orchestral works, electro-acoustic works, music for dance performances, soundtracks, TV-scores, educational works and a number of compositions for percussion. To date, Samkopf has received more than 40 commissions from institutions, ensembles and performers such as Harmonien, the Swedish Radio, Bergen Wind Quintet, NRK, Arts Council Norway, Collage Dance Company, Ultima Oslo Contemporary Music Festival, NorDans Productions, the Arctic Arts Festival, Eirik Raude and Kjell Tore Innervik.

Compositions for dance constitutes a substantial portion of Samkopf's production. The composer has written the scores for nine full length dance productions. His artistic partnership with choreographer Lise Nordal is a cornerstone of this compositional vein. In addition to a number of shorter ballets, Samkopf and Nordal have created five full-length productions Aqua (1986), Tidevann (1990), Til Elise (1996), Entré (2000) and Silent Gliss (2004).

Samkopf's compositional career has seen him evolving from writing for traditional instrumentation to gradually expand his tonal palette to include electronics and more unconventional sonorous objects. His two outdoor concerts held in Sandvika on 8 September 1991 and in Oslo on 3 October 1992 featured ten, large sound sculptures created by artist Sverre Hoel as the works´ main instrumentation. Samkopf's next developmental step is displayed on his two sonographic CD releases Mårådalen Walk (1994) which features field recordings made by the composer in the Norwegian mountains, and Mountain Listening (1998) which is made up of five sonographic portraits of humans listening. These works also serve as a testament to Samkopf's focus on man's relation with nature. Additional key Samkopf releases includes 2002's Music for large Mountain and Vibraphone and 2010's Listening Ahead – Marimba & Town Hall.

Honors 
2012: Edvardprisen in the "Open class" for the album Burragorangian Stones

Production

Selected works

Orchestral works
Konsert for vibrafon og strykere (2008)
Assosiasjoner (1984)
En ouverture (1976)

Chamber music
Chimes of transition (2010)
Eit ord (2007)
Bergen (1995)
After you've gone (1989)
Dobling dance (1981)
Illusions (1979)

Solo works
E 5 S (2005)
Solo piece for tuba (1979)

Works for percussion
Amelioration Études 1 – 9 (2015)
A Book Of Études (2014)
369 For Percussion Trio (2013)
Music for two marimbas - One playing softer than the other (2010/2011)
12 Orchestrations and interludes on Rachmaninoff (2008)
Ingoma intro (1996)
Selvportrett (1984)
Oppfinnelse NR. 5 (1981)
10 Kvartetter for slagverk (1974)

Discography (in selection) 
1983: Music For Solo Percussion And Electronics  (Simax Classics)
1993: Har Du Sunget Den For Grieg?  
1994: Mårådalen Walk 
1994: Kjell Samkopf 
1994: Søyr, Bussene Lengter Hjem 
1996: Kjell Samkopf, Triztan Vindtorn, Nattkonsert med lydskulpturer: Sandvika 8. september 1991 
2012: Burragorangian Stones (Mere Records)

References

External links 

1952 births
Norwegian composers
Norwegian male composers
Living people
Simax Classics artists